Ove is a Scandinavian given name. It is derived from the Old Danish name Aghi, itself probably a diminutive of the prefix Agh-, from the Germanic  (meaning edge or fear). The name Ove is earliest attested in 1434 in Scania.

Owe is another spelling of the same name, and Uwe is the German spelling. The name may refer to the following people:
Ove Andersen (athlete) (1899–1967), Finnish athlete
Ove Andersson (1938–2008), Swedish rally driver
Ove Andersson (footballer) (1916–1983), Swedish footballer
Leif Ove Andsnes (born 1970), Norwegian pianist
Ove Ansteinsson (1884–1942), Norwegian journalist and author
Ove Arup (1895–1988), Danish engineer
Ove Aunli (born 1956), Norwegian cross-country skier
Ove Bang (1895–1942), Norwegian architect
Ove Bengtson (born 1945), Swedish tennis player
Ove Berg (born 1944), Swedish middle-distance runner
Ove H. Berg (1840–1922), American businessman and politician
Stein Ove Berg (1948–2002), Norwegian singer and songwriter
Ove Karl Berthelsen, Greenlandic politician
Ove Alexander Billington (born 1979), Norwegian jazz pianist and composer
Ove Bjelke (1611–1674), Norwegian nobleman and statesman
Ove Blomberg, Swedish footballer
Ove Christensen (born 1950), Danish Association football manager
Kent Ove Clausen (born 1985), Norwegian cross-country skier
Ove Dahl (1862–1940), Norwegian botanist
Ove Dalsheim (born 1944), Norwegian trade unionist and politician
Sten Ove Eike (born 1982), Norwegian footballer
Ove Emanuelsson (born 1941), Swedish canoer
Ove Ericsson, Swedish footballer
Ove Frederiksen (1884–1966), Danish tennis player
Ove Fundin (born 1933), Swedish speedway rider
Ove Gjedde (1594–1660), Danish admiral
Ove Grahn (1943–2007), Swedish footballer
Ove Guldberg (1918–2008), Danish politician
Kjell Ove Hauge (born 1969), Norwegian shot putter and discus thrower
Ove Arbo Høeg (1898–1993), Norwegian botanist
Ove Høegh-Guldberg (1731–1808), Danish politician
Ove Hoegh-Guldberg (born 1959), Australian biologist
Hans Ove Hansen (1904–1994), Saskatchewan farmer and politician
Ove Verner Hansen (1932–2016), Danish opera singer and actor
Sven Ove Hansson (born 1951), Swedish professor of philosophy and author
Nils Ove Hellvik (born 1962), Norwegian footballer
Ove Bjelke Holtermann (1852–1936), Norwegian architect
Ove König (1950–2020), Swedish speed skater
Ove Jensen (1919–2011), Danish footballer
Ove Jensen (cyclist) (born 1947), Danish cyclist
Poul Ove Jensen (born 1937), Danish architect
Ove Joensen (1948–1987), Faeroese seaman
Ove Johansson (born 1948), Swedish player of American football
Ove Jørstad (1970–2008), Norwegian footballer
Ove Juul (1615–1686), Danish nobleman
Truls Ove Karlsen (born 1975), Norwegian skier
Ove Karlsson (footballer) (1915–1982), Swedish footballer
Ove Karlsson (sports journalist) (born 1944), Swedish journalist, member of the ISOH
Ove Karlsson (ice hockey) (born 1950), Swedish ice hockey player
Ove Kindvall (born 1943), Swedish footballer
Ove Kinnmark (1944–2015), Swedish chess master
Ove Christian Charlot Klykken (1862–??), Norwegian politician
Karl Ove Knausgård (born 1968), Norwegian author
Geir Ove Kvalheim (born 1970), Norwegian film producer, director, actor and writer
Ove Lemicka (born 1961), Norwegian politician
Ove Lestander (born 1941), Swedish cross country skier
Ove Liavaag (1938–2007), Norwegian civil servant
Ove Ljung (1918–1997), Swedish Army lieutenant general
Per-Ove Ludvigsen (born 1966), Norwegian footballer
Ove Lundell (1930–2001), Swedish motocross racer
Ove Malmberg (born 1933), Swedish ice hockey player
Ove Gjerløw Meyer (1742–1790), Norwegian writer and jurist
Niels-Ove Mikkelsen (born 1937), Danish sports shooter
Lars Ove Moen (born 1959), Norwegian race walker
Ove Molin (born 1971), Swedish ice hockey player
Ove Nilsson (1918–2010), Swedish footballer
Ove Nylén (born 1959), Swedish Olympic swimmer
Ove Ødegaard (1931–1964), Norwegian footballer
Jan-Ove Palmberg (born 1943), Swedish engineering professor
Ove Paulsen (1874–1947), Danish botanist
Jan Ove Pedersen (born 1968), Norwegian football coach and player
Bent-Ove Pedersen (born 1967), Norwegian tennis player
Svend Ove Pedersen (1920–2009), Danish rower
Ove Pihl (born 1938), Swedish art director, book publisher and graphic designer
Sten-Ove Ramberg (born 1955), Swedish footballer
Ove Rainer (1925–1987), Swedish politician
Ove Krogh Rants (born 1925), Danish cyclist
Ove Rode (1867–1933), Danish politician and newspaper editor
Ove Røsbak (born 1959), Norwegian writer
Ove Rud (1923–2007), Danish actor
Ove Rullestad (born 1940), Norwegian politician
Stig Ove Sandnes (born 1970), Norwegian sports official
Ove Sellberg (born 1959), Swedish golfer
Ove Skåra (born 1961), Norwegian civil servant
Ove Skaug (1912–2005), Norwegian engineer and civil servant
Ove Sprogøe (1919–2004), Danish actor
Kai Ove Stokkeland (born 1978), Norwegian footballer
Svein Ove Strømmen (1949–2010), Norwegian businessperson
Sven-Ove Svensson (1922–1987), Swedish footballer
Ove Thorsheim (born 1949), Norwegian diplomat
Ove Bernt Trellevik (born 1965), Norwegian politician
Ove-Erik Tronvoll (born 1972), Norwegian skier
Ove Vanebo (born 1983), Norwegian politician
Ove von Spaeth (born 1938), Danish writer, designer and scholar
Jan-Ove Waldner (born 1965), Swedish table tennis player
Per Ove Width (born 1939), Norwegian politician

References

Scandinavian masculine given names
Danish masculine given names
Faroese masculine given names
Norwegian masculine given names
Swedish masculine given names